Charles Poor may refer to:

Charles Henry Poor (1808–1882), United States Navy admiral
Charles Lane Poor (1866–1951), American astronomy professor